The fifth season brought another change in the competition structure. Following the idea to make the league as strong as possible the management of the Goodyear league decided to reduce the number of clubs from 16 to 14 again.

14 teams from Slovenia, Croatia, Bosnia and Herzegovina, Serbia and Montenegro participated in Goodyear League in its fifth season: Union Olimpija, Helios, Pivovarna Laško, Geoplin Slovan, Cibona, Zadar, Zagreb, Široki ERONET, Bosna ASA BH TELECOM, Crvena zvezda, Partizan, Hemofarm, FMP Železnik, Vojvodina Srbijagas.

There were 26 rounds played in the regular part of the season, best eight teams qualified for the Final Eight Tournament which was played in Sarajevo since April 20 until April 23, 2006.

FMP Železnik became the Goodyear League Champion.

Regular season

Stats Leaders

Points

Rebounds

Assists

Ranking MVP

Final eight
Matches played at Dvorana Mirza Delibašić, Sarajevo

2005–06
2005–06 in European basketball leagues
2005–06 in Serbian basketball
2005–06 in Slovenian basketball
2005–06 in Croatian basketball
2005–06 in Bosnia and Herzegovina basketball